Eyvind Getz (1888–1956) was a Norwegian barrister and  mayor of Oslo, Norway.

He was born in  Kristiania (now Oslo), Norway. He was a son of jurist Bernhard Getz (1850–1901) and Johanne Christiane Fredrikke Berg (1855–1924). He earned his cand.jur. from the University of Kristiania in 1911.

He was a barrister by profession and was associated with the firm of Blom, Koss & Nielsen from 1915-1920. He established his own law firm in  1920.
He was a member of the Oslo  City Council from  1922, served  deputy mayor from 1927-1928 and was Mayor of Oslo from 1932-34. 
He was Deputy Governor of Norges Kommunalbank Board from 1927 and was also chair of Oslo Kinematografer from 1932 to 1934.

References

1888 births
1956 deaths
Lawyers from Oslo
University of Oslo alumni
Mayors of Oslo
Conservative Party (Norway) politicians
Norwegian people of German descent
20th-century Norwegian lawyers